Champdani Assembly constituency is an assembly constituency in Hooghly district in the Indian state of West Bengal.

Overview
As per orders of the Delimitation Commission, No. 187 Champdani Assembly constituency is composed of the following: Champdany Municipality, Baidyabati Municipality, Ward Nos. 1 & 2 and 20 to 24 of Serampore Municipality and Payarapur gram panchayat of Sreerampur-Uttarpara community development block.

Champdani Assembly constituency is part of No. 27 Sreerampur (Lok Sabha constituency).

Members of Legislative Assembly

Election Result 
2021

In 2021 West Bengal Assembly Election All Indian Trinamool Congress candidate and Ex Chairman of Baidyabati Municipality Arindam Guin (Bubai) defeated his nearest rival Dilip Singh of Bharatiya Janta Party by 30,078 votes.

2016
In the 2016 election, Abdul Mannan of Indian National Congress (supported by Left Front) defeated his nearest rival Muzaffar Khan Trinamool Congress. He later on became the Leader of Opposition in the West Bengal Legislative Assembly.

2011

  

.# Swing calculated on Congress+Trinamool Congress vote percentages taken together in 2006.

1977-2006
In the 2006 state assembly elections, Jibesh Chakraborty of CPI(M) won the Champdani assembly seat defeating his nearest rival Abdul Mannan of Congress. Contests in most years were multi cornered but only winners and runners are being mentioned. Abdul Mannan of Congress defeated Kaji Abdul Hai of CPI(M) in 2001, and Sunil Sarkar of CPI(M) in 1996 and 1991. Sunil Sarkar of CPI(M) defeated Gouri Sankar Banerjee of Congress in 1987. Sailendra Nath Chattopadhyay of CPI(M) defeated Swaraj Mukhopadhyay of Congress in 1982 and Bibhas Chandra Ghosh of Janata Party in 1977.

1967-1972
Girija Bhushan Mukhopadhyay of CPI won in 1972. Haripada Mukherjee of CPI(M) won in 1971 and 1969. Byomkesh Majumdar of Congress won in 1967. Prior to that the Champdani seat did not exist.

References

Assembly constituencies of West Bengal
Politics of Hooghly district